Aga Khan University is a non-profit institution and an agency of the Aga Khan Development Network. It was Founded in 1983 as Pakistan's first private university. Starting in 2000, the university expanded to Kenya, Tanzania, Uganda, the United Kingdom and Afghanistan.

AKU began life as a health-sciences university. It is among the largest private health-care providers in Pakistan and East Africa. AKU hospitals were the first in those regions accredited by U.S.-based Joint Commission International.

More recently, the university has initiated programmes in teacher education, the study of Muslim civilisations, journalism, early childhood development and public policy. In the near future, the university plans to launch an undergraduate liberal-arts programme to educate future leaders in a wide range of fields and establish additional graduate professional schools.

History 

Founded in 1983 by the Prince Aga Khan IV, AKU is one of the Aga Khan Development Network agencies.

 1964: The Chancellor announces plans to construct Aga Khan Hospital and Medical College
 1980: The contract for the main complex of Aga Khan University Hospital and Medial College was signed in London
 1983: Former President of Pakistan presented the Charter of the university to the Chancellor, making it the first private international university in Pakistan; the first class of the university's School of Nursing graduates
 1985: Aga Khan University Hospital, Karachi inaugurated
 1989: The university's medical college's first batch graduates
 1994: The Institute for Educational Development, Karachi inaugurated
 2001: The Advanced Nursing Studies Programme launched in Uganda
 2002: The Institute for the Study of Muslim Civilisations established in London
 2005: Aga Khan Hospital, Nairobi upgraded to Aga Khan University Hospital, Nairobi
 2006: Inaugurated the Institute for Educational Development in East Africa, and the French Medical Institute for Children, managed by AKU, in Kabul
 2007: The Examination Board conducts its first Secondary School Certificate examinations
 2012: Founded Graduate School of Media and Communications, Institute for Human Development, and East Africa Institute
2021: Aga Khan University, Kenya granted charter by President Uhuru Kenyatta.
2022: Aga Khan University launches the Faculty of Arts and Sciences on the Stadium Road Campus, Karachi, Pakistan. The Inaugural Dean was appointed in September 2022.

Academics
The Aga Khan University accounts for 75% of all biomedical research in Pakistan while the remaining 25 percent is shared by all the other institutions. AKU publishes more research articles in peer-reviewed, indexed internationally recognised journals than any other university in Pakistan. Faculty promotions are dependent on publications in indexed journals while most medical students have published by the time they graduate. Undergraduate medical students have published up to 50 research papers in indexed health journals.

It is the one of the few universities in Pakistan to provide research facilities to students at the undergraduate level. The university maintains a research office to guide and support research conducted at the university. A University Research Council also funds grants after a competitive review process facilitated by a Grants Review Committee. Particular emphasis is also placed on community related health sciences research. AKU organizes international and national research workshops and seminars. A Health Sciences Research Assembly is held annually in which faculty and students present their research.

The university is a site for NIH clinical trials. The seal (logo) of the Aga Khan University is a visual representation of the principles which underlie the founding of the university. The circular form of the seal has its roots in the rosettes of early Islamic periods. It also symbolizes the world and reflects the internationality of the Aga Khan University. At the centre of the seal is a star or sun representing light – a universal symbol of the enlightenment that education provides. The light is also symbolic of Nur (divine light). The star incorporates 49 points to commemorate the university's founding by Prince Karim Aga Khan, the Forty-Ninth imam of the Ismaili Muslims. The outer ring circumscribes a Quranic Ayat (3:103) rendered in classic thuluth script.

Campuses 

The Aga Khan University is an international university, operating on campuses in Central and South Asia, the African Great Lakes, Europe and the Middle East. In Pakistan, the university is an 84-acre campus including a hospital with two on-campus male and female hostels with a capacity of 300 each. It has a sports and rehabilitation center which is one of the best in Pakistan, with an Olympic-standard swimming pool, cricket practice nets, tennis courts, indoor gymnasium with wooden flooring, squash courts and gyms. It has cricket and football grounds with jogging tracks.

Existing campuses and international programmes include:
Faculty of Health Sciences located on an  campus in the heart of Karachi, Pakistan, built in the 1980s
Aga Khan University Health Sciences campus in Nairobi, Kenya
Faculty of Arts and Sciences housed in the University Centre on the Stadium Road Campus in Karachi, Pakistan. The Faculty of Arts and Sciences offers undergraduate majors in Asian and Middle Eastern Studies, Social and Development Studies, Human and Environmental Biology, and Politics Philosophy and Economics.
Institute for Educational Development in the Karimabad area of Karachi, Pakistan and Dar es Salaam, Tanzania
Institute for the Study of Muslim Civilisations in London, United Kingdom
 A USD 450 million campus planned for Arusha, in north-eastern Tanzania to be built in the next 15 years
Advanced Nursing Studies (ANS) Programmes at campuses in Kenya, Tanzania and Uganda
Programmes for capacity development for teachers and nurses in Afghanistan, Egypt and Syria

Institutes and Graduate Schools
The university is home to several teaching and research Institutes on its different campuses. The Institutes each drive one of the thematic priorities of AKU and AKDN. In London, the Institute for the Study of Muslim Civilisations is a dedicated interdisciplinary research and graduate school that brings together humanities scholars and social scientists to critically engage with cultural, historical, political, economic, legal and religious aspects of Muslim societies. In Pakistan and East Africa, AKU has two Institutes that focus on education: the Institute for Educational Development Pakistan, and Institute for Educational Development East Africa.

Institute for the Study of Muslim Civilisations
The Institute for the Study of Muslim Civilisations (AKU-ISMC) was founded in 2002 and accepted its first intake of graduate students in 2006. The AKU-ISMC offers an MA in Muslim Cultures. The MA is accredited by the Higher Education Commission (Pakistan) of Pakistan and regulated by the Quality Assurance Agency in the UK. Since 2018, AKU-ISMC has been based in the Aga Khan Centre in the King's Cross area of London. The Aga Khan Centre was designed by the architect Fumihiko Maki.

In 2020, AKU signed a partnership with Columbia University launching a dual masters in September 2020.

Institute for Educational Development - Pakistan and East Africa
The Institute for Educational Development in Karachi and East Africa (AKU-IED) is a center for developing teachers, educators, education managers, researchers and policy makers. Apart from teacher training, AKU-IED offers MEd (Masters of Education) and PhD. in Education as well. Established in 2003. AKU-EB is a federal Board of Intermediate and Secondary education in Pakistan. AKU-EB examines students at SSC and HSSC level.

Graduate School of Media and Communications
Launched in 2015, the Aga Khan University Graduate School of Media and Communications (GSMC) is focused on education and tailored training for journalists, communicators and media executives and entrepreneurs in East Africa and beyond. On 7 December 2019, GSMC announced a partnership with Facebook to launch the Video Journalism Fellowship.

Notable alumni, professors and staff

Professors and staff
Abdul Gaffar Billoo, pediatric endocrinologist, professor of clinical pediatrics at the Aga Khan University (AKU)
John Harland Bryant, former Professor of Community Health Sciences
Zulfiqar Bhutta, Director of the Institute for Global Health and Development
Sahabzada Yaqub Khan, former foreign minister of Pakistan
Marleen Temmerman, Chair of the Department of Obstetrics and Gynaecology, Aga Khan University Kenya
Leif Stenberg, Professor of Islamic Studies and Dean of the Institute for the Study of Muslim Civilisations (UK)

Notable alumni
 Adil Haider, trauma surgeon and outcomes research scientist in the United States
 Fahim Rahim, nephrologist, recipient of Ellis Island Medals of Honor in 2011
Naeem Rahim, nephrologist and founder of Idaho based JRM Foundation for humanity

Awards and Accolades
Centre for Innovation in Medical Education is South Asia's first to be accredited by US-based Society for Simulation in Healthcare.
Village Land Use Plan awarded the Society for College and University Planning's Merit Award for Excellence in Planning for a District or Campus Component.
Medical College (Pakistan) Urban Health Programme awarded MacJannet Prize for Global Citizenship 2009.
Zairi International Award in Higher Education 2022, Award of Excellence for Disruptive Education.

See also
Aga Khan University Hospital
Aga Khan Development Network

References

External links
Aga Khan University
Aga Khan University Alumni Association
Video: AKU President Firoz Rasul speaks on next 25 years of the Aga Khan University

 
Educational institutions established in 1983
Private universities and colleges in Sindh
Medical colleges in Sindh
Universities and colleges in London
Private universities and colleges in Kenya
Private universities in Tanzania
1983 establishments in Pakistan